The 2016 Georgia State Panthers beach volleyball represented Georgia State University during the college beach volleyball season of 2016. The team's head coach was Beth Van Fleet in her third season at GSU. The Panthers played their home games at the GSU Beach Volleyball Complex and competed in the  Division I Coastal Collegiate Sports Association. The 2015 season was the first as an official NCAA sport, the designation being coordinated with a name change from sand volleyball to beach volleyball. The season was also the Panthers first in the CCSA, finishing in second place. The Panthers were ranked in the official top 10 during the entire season, earning a spot as the 7th seed in the NCAA Tournament.

2015 Roster

Schedule

|- bgcolor="#ccffcc"
| March 5 || North Florida || 8 || – || Boca Raton, Florida || 9:00 PM || W 4-1 || 1-0 (0–0)
|- bgcolor="#ccffcc"
| March 5 || Webber || 8 || – || Boca Raton, Florida || 11:00 AM || W 5-1 || 2-0 (0–0)
|- align="center" bgcolor="#ffccc"
| March 5 || Florida Atlantic* || 8 || – || Boca Raton, Florida || 3:00 PM || L 2–3 || 2-1 (0–1)
|- bgcolor="#ccffcc"
| March 9 || Mercer || 10 || – || GSU Beach Volleyball Complex || 5:00 PM || W 5-0 || 3-1 (0–1)
|- bgcolor="#ccffcc"
| March 12 || Stetson || 10 || – || Baton Rouge, LA || 2:00 PM || W 3-2 || 4-1 (0–1)
|- bgcolor="#ccffcc"
| March 12 || Florida International* || 10 || 9 || Baton Rouge, LA || 4:00 PM || W 4-1 || 5-1 (1–1)
|- bgcolor="#ccffcc"
| March 12 || New Orleans || 10 || – || Baton Rouge, LA || 6:00 PM || W 5-0 || 6-1 (1–1)
|- bgcolor="#ccffcc"
| March 13 || ULM || 10 || – || Baton Rouge, LA || 11:00 AM || W 5-0 || 7-1 (1–1)
|- bgcolor="#ccffcc"
| March 13 || LSU* || 10 || – || Baton Rouge, LA || 1:00 PM || W 3-2 || 8-1 (2–1)
|- align="center" bgcolor="#ffccc"
| March 21 || Pepperdine || 8 || 1 || Charleston, SC || 11:00 AM || L 1–4 || 8-2 (2–1)
|- bgcolor="#ccffcc"
| March 21 || Lincoln Memorial || 8 || – || Charleston, SC || 1:30 PM || W 5-0 || 9-2 (2–1)
|- bgcolor="#ccffcc"
| March 22 || UNC Wilmington || 8 || – || Charleston, SC || 3:00 PM || W 5-0 || 10-2 (2–1)
|- bgcolor="#ccffcc"
| March 25 || Eckerd || 8 || – || GSU Beach Volleyball Complex || 1:00 PM|| W 5-0 || 11-2 (2–1)
|- bgcolor="#ccffcc"
| March 25 || Lincoln Memorial || 8 || – || GSU Beach Volleyball Complex || 5:00 PM || W 4-1 || 12-2 (2–1)
|- bgcolor="#ccffcc"
| March 26 || UNC Wilmington || 8 || – || GSU Beach Volleyball Complex || 1:00 PM || W 5-0 || 13-2 (2–1)
|- bgcolor="#ccffcc"
| March 26 || ULM || 8 || – || GSU Beach Volleyball Complex || 5:00 PM || W 5-0 || 14-2 (2–1)
|- bgcolor="#ccffcc"
| March 29 || Mercer || 8 || – || Macon, GA || 4:00 PM || W 4-1 || 15-2 (2–1)
|- bgcolor="#ccffcc"
| April 1 || South Carolina* || 8 || – || Ft. Lauderdale, FL || 9:00 AM || W 5-0 || 16-2 (3–1)
|- align="center" bgcolor="#ffccc"
| April 1 || USC || 8 || 2 || Ft. Lauderdale, FL || 12:00 PM || L 1–4 || 16-3 (3–1)
|- bgcolor="#ccffcc"
| April 2 || Florida Atlantic* || 8 || – || Ft. Lauderdale, FL || 12:00 PM || W 4-1 || 17-3 (4–1)
|- align="center" bgcolor="#ffccc"
| April 2 || Florida International* || 8 || 10 || Ft. Lauderdale, FL || 4:00 PM || L 2–3 || 17-4 (4–2)
|- bgcolor="#ccffcc"
| April 8 || Houston Baptist || 9 || – || New Orleans, LA || 10:20 PM || W 5-0 || 18-4 (4–2)
|- align="center" bgcolor="#ffccc"
| April 8 || Arizona || 9 || 7 || New Orleans, LA || 3:45 PM || L 2–3 || 18-5 (4–2)
|- align="center" bgcolor="#ffccc"
| April 9 || Tulane* || 9 || – || New Orleans, LA || 11:40 AM || L 2–3 || 18-6 (4–3)
|- bgcolor="#ccffcc"
| April 9 || LSU* || 9 || – || New Orleans || 2:20 PM || W 4-1 || 19-6 (5–3)
|- bgcolor="#ccffcc"
| April 15 || College of Charleston || 9 || – || Tallahassee, FL || 3:30 PM || W 5-0 || 20-6 (5–3)
|- align="center" bgcolor="#ffccc"
| April 15 || Florida State* || 9 || 3 || Tallahassee, FL || 6:30 PM || L 2–3 || 20-7 (5–4)
|- bgcolor="#ccffcc"
| April 16 || North Florida || 9 || – || Tallahassee, FL || 1:00 PM || W 2–3 || 21-7 (5–4)
|- bgcolor="#ccffcc"
| April 16 || UAB* || 9 || – || Tallahassee, FL || 4:00 PM || W 4-1 || 22-7 (5–4)
|- bgcolor="#ccffcc"
| April 22 || Florida International (CCSA Championship) || 9 || 10 || Ft. Lauderdale, FL || 9:30 AM || W 3-2 || 23-7 (1-0 Tournament)
|- bgcolor="#ccffcc"
| April 22 || Florida Atlantic (CCSA Championship) || 9 || – || Ft. Lauderdale, FL || 2:30 PM || W  3-2 || 24-7 (2-0 Tournament)
|- bgcolor="#ccffcc"
| April 23 || Tulane (CCSA Championship) || 9 || – || Ft. Lauderdale, FL || 9:00 AM || W 5-0 || 25-7 (3-0 Tournament)
|- bgcolor="#ccffcc"
| April 24 || LSU (CCSA Championship Semifinal) || 9 || – || Ft. Lauderdale, FL || 9:30 AM || W  3-2 || 26-7 (4-0 Tournament)
|- align="center" bgcolor="#ffccc"
| April 24 || Florida State (CCSA Championship Final) || 9 || 3 || Ft. Lauderdale, FL || 1:00 PM || L 0–3 || 26-8 (4-1 Tournament)
|- align="center" bgcolor="#ffccc"
| May 6 || USC Trojans (NCAA First Round) || 7 || 2 || Gulf Shores, AL || 12:00 PM || L 0–3 || 26-9 (0–1 Tournament)
|- align="center" bgcolor="#ffccc"
| May 6 || Arizona (NCAA First Round Elimination Bracket) || 7 || 6 || Gulf Shores, AL || 3:00 PM || L 2–3 || 26-10 (0–2 Tournament)
|-

Conference Games

References

External links
 Georgia State University Official website
 Georgia State Panthers Official Athletics website

2016
Georgia State Panthers women's beach volleyball